Arthur Mohns (4 December 1896 – 1960) was a German international footballer.

References

1896 births
1960 deaths
Date of death missing
Association football defenders
German footballers
Germany international footballers